Olasana Island is a 7.93 hectare, uninhabited island in the New Georgia Islands of the Western Province of the Solomon Islands. The island is primarily notable for its role in the events after the sinking of PT-109 involving future American president John F. Kennedy.

PT-109
Shortly after midnight on August 2, 1943, an American torpedo patrol boat, PT-109, was struck by a Japanese warship, killing two. As the ship began to sink, the remaining crew swam to what is now known as Kennedy Island. Subsequently the wounded crew made a swim and changed to Olasana Island. Finding only coconuts but no water, Kennedy and another crew member swam to Naru Island and then canoed back some supplies to Olasana. They would there come across locals Biuku Gasa and Eroni Kumana, which precipitated their rescue.

See also
Kennedy Island
Naru Island (Solomon Islands)

Islands of the Solomon Islands
Western Province (Solomon Islands)